An endangered species is a species that is very likely to become extinct in the near future, either worldwide or in a particular political jurisdiction. Endangered species may be at risk due to factors such as habitat loss, poaching and invasive species. The International Union for Conservation of Nature (IUCN) Red List lists the global conservation status of many species, and various other agencies assess the status of species within particular areas. Many nations have laws that protect conservation-reliant species which, for example, forbid hunting, restrict land development, or create protected areas. Some endangered species are the target of extensive conservation efforts such as captive breeding and habitat restoration.

Human activity is a significant cause in causing some species to become endangered.

Conservation status 

The conservation status of a species indicates the likelihood that it will become extinct.  Multiple factors are considered when assessing the status of a species; e.g., such statistics as the number remaining, the overall increase or decrease in the population over time, breeding success rates, or known threats.  The IUCN Red List of Threatened Species is the best-known worldwide conservation status listing and ranking system.

Over 50% of the world's species are estimated to be at risk of extinction, but the frontier between categories such as 'endangered', 'rare', or 'locally extinct' species is often difficult to draw given the general paucity of data on most of these species. This is notably the case in the world Ocean where endangered species not seen for decades may go extinct unnoticed.   

Internationally, 195 countries have signed an accord to create Biodiversity Action Plans that will protect endangered and other threatened species. In the United States, such plans are usually called Species Recovery Plans.

IUCN Red List 

Though labeled a list, the IUCN Red List is a system of assessing the global conservation status of species that includes "Data Deficient" (DD) species – species for which more data and assessment is required before their situation may be determined – as well species comprehensively assessed by the IUCN's species assessment process. The species under the index include: mammals, birds, amphibians, cycads, and corals. Those species of "Near Threatened" (NT) and "Least Concern" (LC) status have been assessed and found to have relatively robust and healthy populations, though these may be in decline. Unlike their more general use elsewhere, the List uses the terms "endangered species" and "threatened species" with particular meanings: "Endangered" (EN) species lie between "Vulnerable" (VU) and "Critically Endangered" (CR) species. In 2012, the IUCN Red List listed 3,079 animal and 2,655 plant species as endangered (EN) worldwide.

In Brazil 
Brazil is one of the most biodiverse countries in the world, if not the most. It houses not only the Amazon forest but the Atlantic forest, the savanna-like Cerrado among other biomes. Due to the high density of some of its well-preserved rainforests, wildlife trafficking, which along with deforestation is the one of the biggest endangerment drivers in Brazil, has become a challenge. The country has a broad legal system meant to protect the environment, including its Constitution, as well as several federal, state and local government agencies tasked with protecting the fauna and flora, fining individuals or companies linked to environmental crimes and confiscating illegally taken wildlife. Though such agencies can collect their data, each system operates relatively on its own when it comes to wildlife trafficking. However, both the agencies and the NGO's working in Brazil agree that the birds account for about 80% of trafficked species in the country.

The relation between wildlife smuggling, other environment crimes under the Brazilian law such as deforestation, and endangered species is particularly intricate and troubling since the rarer the animal or plant gets the most targeted and valuable they become in the black market, which leads to more endangered species in its turn.

Additionally, many environment experts and scientists point to the disbanding of environment agencies and the repeal of laws in Brazil under the presidency of Jair Bolsonaro as one of the reasons behind a surge in the number of endangered species. In one occasion during his presidency some fines totaling US $3.1 billion on environment criminals were revoked and at least one fine (related to illegal fishing) imposed on Bolsonaro himself was cancelled and the agent who fined him was demoted.

In the past, Brazil has successfully saved the endemic golden lion tamarin from extinction. Massive campaigns to raise awareness among people by NGO's and governments, which included printing depictions of the golden lion tamarin in the 20 reais Brazilian banknotes (still in circulation), are credited with getting the species out of the critically-endangered animals list.

In the United States 
There is data from the United States that shows a correlation between human populations and threatened and endangered species. Using species data from the Database on the Economics and Management of Endangered Species (DEMES) database and the period that the Endangered Species Act (ESA) has been in existence, 1970 to 1997, a table was created that suggests a positive relationship between human activity and species endangerment.

Endangered Species Act

Under the Endangered Species Act of 1973 in the United States, species may be listed as "endangered" or "threatened". The Salt Creek tiger beetle (Cicindela nevadica lincolniana) is an example of an endangered subspecies protected under the ESA. The US Fish and Wildlife Service, as well as the National Marine Fisheries Service are held responsible for classifying and protecting endangered species. They are also responsible for adding a particular species to the list, which can be a long, controversial process.

Some endangered species laws are controversial. Typical areas of controversy include criteria for placing a species on the endangered species list and rules for removing a species from the list once its population has recovered. Whether restrictions on land development constitute a "taking" of land by the government; the related question of whether private landowners should be compensated for the loss of uses of their areas; and obtaining reasonable exceptions to protection laws. Also lobbying from hunters and various industries like the petroleum industry, construction industry, and logging, has been an obstacle in establishing endangered species laws.

The Bush administration lifted a policy that required federal officials to consult a wildlife expert before taking actions that could damage endangered species. Under the Obama administration, this policy was reinstated.

Being listed as an endangered species can have negative effect since it could make a species more desirable for collectors and poachers. This effect is potentially reducible, such as in China where commercially farmed turtles may be reducing some of the pressure to poach endangered species.

Another problem with the listing species is its effect of inciting the use of the "shoot, shovel, and shut-up" method of clearing endangered species from an area of land. Some landowners currently may perceive a diminution in value for their land after finding an endangered animal on it. They have allegedly opted to kill and bury the animals or destroy habitat silently. Thus removing the problem from their land, but at the same time further reducing the population of an endangered species. The effectiveness of the Endangered Species Act – which coined the term "endangered species" – has been questioned by business advocacy groups and their publications but is nevertheless widely recognized by wildlife scientists who work with the species as an effective recovery tool. Nineteen species have been delisted and recovered and 93% of listed species in the northeastern United States have a recovering or stable population.

Currently, 1,556 endangered species are under protection by government law. This approximation, however, does not take into consideration the species threatened with endangerment that are not included under the protection of laws like the Endangered Species Act. According to NatureServe's global conservation status, approximately thirteen percent of vertebrates (excluding marine fish), seventeen percent of vascular plants, and six to eighteen percent of fungi are considered imperiled. Thus, in total, between seven and eighteen percent of the United States' known animals, fungi and plants are near extinction. This total is substantially more than the number of species protected in the United States under the Endangered Species Act.

Ever since mankind began hunting to preserve itself, over-hunting and fishing have been a large and dangerous problem. Of all the species who became extinct due to interference from mankind, the dodo, passenger pigeon, great auk, Tasmanian tiger and Steller's sea cow are some of the more well known examples; with the bald eagle, grizzly bear, American bison, Eastern timber wolf and sea turtle having been poached to near-extinction.  Many began as food sources seen as necessary for survival but became the target of sport. However, due to major efforts to prevent extinction, the bald eagle, or Haliaeetus leucocephalus is now under the category of Least Concern on the red list. A present-day example of the over-hunting of a species can be seen in the oceans as populations of certain whales have been greatly reduced. Large whales like the blue whale, bowhead whale, finback whale, gray whale, sperm whale, and humpback whale are some of the eight whales which are currently still included on the Endangered Species List. Actions have been taken to attempt a reduction in whaling and increase population sizes.  The actions include prohibiting all whaling in United States waters, the formation of the CITES treaty which protects all whales, along with the formation of the International Whaling Commission (IWC).  But even though all of these movements have been put in place, countries such as Japan continue to hunt and harvest whales under the claim of "scientific purposes". Over-hunting, climatic change and habitat loss leads in landing species in endangered species list. It could mean that extinction rates could increase to a large extent in the future.

In Canada 
Endangered species are addressed through Canada's Species at Risk Act. A species is deemed threatened or endangered when it is on the verge of extinction or extirpation. Once a species is deemed threatened or endangered, the Act requires that a recovery plan to be developed that indicates how to stop or reverse the species' population decline. As of 2021, the Committee on the Status of Endangered Wildlife In Canada (COSEWIC) has assessed 369 species as being endangered in Canada.

In India 
The World Wide Fund-India raises concern in the longevity of the following animal species: the Red Panda, the Bengal Tiger, the Ganges River Dolphin, the Asian Elephant.

India signed the Wildlife Protection Act and the also joined the Convention on the International Trade in 1976, to prevent poaching from harming its wildlife.

Invasive species 

The introduction of non-indigenous species to an area can disrupt the ecosystem to such an extent that native species become endangered. Such introductions may be termed alien or invasive species. In some cases, the invasive species compete with the native species for food or prey on the natives. In other cases, a stable ecological balance may be upset by predation or other causes leading to unexpected species decline. New species may also carry diseases to which the native species have no exposure or resistance.

Conservation

Captive breeding

Captive breeding is the process of breeding rare or endangered species in human controlled environments with restricted settings, such as wildlife reserves, zoos, and other conservation facilities. Captive breeding is meant to save species from extinction and so stabilise the population of the species that it will not disappear.

This technique has worked for many species for some time, with probably the oldest known such instances of captive mating being attributed to menageries of European and Asian rulers, an example being the Père David's deer. However, captive breeding techniques are usually difficult to implement for such highly mobile species as some migratory birds (e.g. cranes) and fishes (e.g. hilsa). Additionally, if the captive breeding population is too small, then inbreeding may occur due to a reduced gene pool and reduce resistance.

In 1981, the Association of Zoos and Aquariums (AZA) created a Species Survival Plan (SSP) to help preserve specific endangered and threatened species through captive breeding.  With over 450 SSP Plans, some endangered species are covered by the AZA with plans to cover population management goals and recommendations for breeding for a diverse and healthy population, created by Taxon Advisory Groups. These programs are commonly created as a last resort effort. SSP Programs regularly participate in species recovery, veterinary care for wildlife disease outbreaks, and some other wildlife conservation efforts. The AZA's Species Survival Plan also has breeding and transfer programs, both within and outside of AZA – certified zoos and aquariums. Some animals that are part of SSP programs are giant pandas, lowland gorillas, and California condors.

Private farming

Whereas poaching substantially reduces endangered animal populations, legal, for-profit, private farming does the opposite. It has substantially increased the populations of the southern black rhinoceros and southern white rhinoceros. Dr Richard Emslie, a scientific officer at the IUCN, said of such programs, "Effective law enforcement has become much easier now that the animals are largely privately owned... We have been able to bring local communities into conservation programs. There are increasingly strong economic incentives attached to looking after rhinos rather than simply poaching: from Eco-tourism or selling them on for a profit. So many owners are keeping them secure. The private sector has been key to helping our work."

Conservation experts view the effect of China's turtle farming on the wild turtle populations of China and South-Eastern Asia – many of which are endangered – as "poorly understood". Although they commend the gradual replacement of turtles caught wild with farm-raised turtles in the marketplace – the percentage of farm-raised individuals in the "visible" trade grew from around 30% in 2000 to around 70% in 2007 – they worry that many wild animals are caught to provide farmers with breeding stock. The conservation expert Peter Paul van Dijk noted that turtle farmers often believe that animals caught wild are superior breeding stock. Turtle farmers may, therefore, seek and catch the last remaining wild specimens of some endangered turtle species.

In 2015, researchers in Australia managed to coax southern bluefin tuna to breed in landlocked tanks, raising the possibility that fish farming may be able to save the species from overfishing.

Gallery

See also 
 ARKive
 Biodiversity
 Center for Biological Diversity
 Conservation cloning
 Critically Endangered
 Ex situ conservation
 Genome sequencing of endangered species
 Habitat fragmentation
 Holocene extinction
 International Rhino Foundation
 International Union for Conservation of Nature (IUCN)
 Overexploitation
 Rare species
 Red Data Book of the Russian Federation
 Threatened species
 World Wide Fund for Nature (WWF)

IUCN Red List
 List of Chromista by conservation status
 List of endangered amphibians
 List of endangered arthropods
 List of endangered birds
 List of endangered fishes
 List of endangered insects
 List of endangered invertebrates
 List of endangered mammals
 List of endangered molluscs
 List of endangered plants
 List of endangered reptiles
 List of fungi by conservation status
 Lists of IUCN Red List endangered species

References

Further reading 

 Glenn, C. R. 2006. "Earth's Endangered Creatures" .
 Ishwaran, N., & Erdelen, W. (2005, May). Biodiversity Futures , Frontiers in Ecology and the Environment, 3(4), 179.
 Kotiaho, J. S., Kaitala, V., Komonen, A., Päivinen, J. P., & Ehrlich, P. R. (2005, February 8). Predicting the Risk of Extinction from Shared Ecological Characteristics , proceedings of the National Academy of Sciences of the United States of America, 102(6), 1963–1967.
 Minteer, B. A., & Collins, J. P. (2005, August). Why we need an "Ecological Ethics" , Frontiers in Ecology and the Environment, 3(6), 332–337.
 Raloff, J. (2006, August 5). Preserving Paradise , Science News, 170(6), 92.
 Wilcove, D. S., & Master L. L. (2008, October). How Many Endangered Species are there in the United States?  Frontiers in Ecology and the Environment, 3(8), 414–420.
 Freedman, Bill. "endangered species." Gale Encyclopedia of Science. Ed. K. Lee Lerner and Brenda Wilmoth Lerner. 4th ed. Detroit: Gale Group, 2008. Discovering Collection. Gale.
 Chiras, Daniel D. "Invader Species." Grolier Multimedia Encyclopedia. Grolier Online, 2011.
 "endangered Species." Current Issues: Macmillan Social Science Library. Detroit: Gale, 2010.

External links 
 List of species with the category Endangered as identified by the IUCN Red List of Threatened Species
 Endangered Species from UCB Libraries GovPubs.
 Endangered Species & Wetlands Report Independent print and online newsletter covering the ESA, wetlands and regulatory takings.
 USFWS numerical summary of listed species in US and elsewhere
 Extinction: A million species at risk, so what is saved? BBC. December 28, 2019.
 'Generally ignored' species face twice the extinction threat, warns study. The Guardian. August 4, 2022

 
Biota by conservation status
Environmental conservation
Habitat
IUCN Red List
IUCN Red List endangered species